Bouet's worm snake (Myriopholis boueti) is a species of snake in the family Leptotyphlopidae. The species is native to West Africa.

Etymology
The specific name, boueti, is in honor of Georges Bouet (1869–1957), who was a French ornithologist and physician.

Geographic range
M. boueti is found in Burkina Faso, Chad, The Gambia, Ghana, Guinea, Guinea-Bissau, Ivory Coast, Liberia, Mali, Niger, Nigeria, Senegal, Sierra Leone, Togo, and Western Sahara.

Habitat
The preferred natural habitat of M. boueti is savanna.

Description

Reproduction
M. boueti is oviparous.

References

Further reading
Adalsteinsson SA, Branch WR, Trape S, Vitt LJ, Hedges SB (2009). "Molecular phylogeny, classification, and biogeography of snakes of the family Leptotyphlopidae (Reptilia, Squamata)". Zootaxa 2244: 1-50. (Myriopholis boueti, new combination).
Chabanaud P (1917). "Note complémentaire sur les Ophidiens de l'Afrique occidentale, avec la description d'une espèce nouvelle ". Bulletin du Muséum National d'Histoire Naturelle 23: 7–14. (Glauconia boueti, new species, pp. 9–10, Figures 1–3). (in French).

Myriopholis
Snakes of Africa
Reptiles of West Africa
Reptiles described in 1917
Taxa named by Paul Chabanaud